Penn is a 2006 Indian Tamil-language soap opera that aired Monday through Friday on Sun TV from 27 February 2006 to 24 November 2006 for 195 episodes.

The show starred Seetha, Meera Vasudevan, Delhi Ganesh, Ajay Rathnam, Viji Chandrasekhar, T. V. Varadarajan, Subhalekha Sudhakar and Dr. Sharmila among others. It was produced by Aniksha Productions, director by C.J. Baskar. Penn is all about the hardships and ordeal that women face in their life.

Plot
The story of Ranganayaki (Seetha) a woman who heads a business empire and Deepa (Meera Vasudevan) is inducted into the family business.

Cast

Original soundtrack

Title song
It was written by lyricist Vairamuthu, composed by the music director Ramkiran Dhina. It was sung by Nithyasree Mahadevan, Dev Prakash and Jaidev.

Soundtrack

See also

 List of programs broadcast by Sun TV

References

External links
 Official Website 

Sun TV original programming
2006 Tamil-language television series debuts
Tamil-language television shows
2006 Tamil-language television series endings